The 2020 Grand Prix La Marseillaise was the 41st edition of the Grand Prix La Marseillaise cycle race. It was held on 2 February 2020 as a category 1.1 race on the 2020 UCI Europe Tour. The race started and finished in Marseille.

Teams
Fifteen teams of up to seven riders started the race:

Result

References

2020 in French sport
2020 UCI Europe Tour
Grand Prix La Marseillaise
February 2020 sports events in France